John Joseph Douglass (February 9, 1873 – April 5, 1939) was a member of the United States House of Representatives from Massachusetts.

Life and career
He was born in East Boston, Suffolk County, Massachusetts, on February 9, 1873. Douglass graduated from Boston College in 1893 and from the law department of Georgetown University, Washington, D.C., in 1896. He was admitted to the bar in 1897 and commenced practice in Boston.

Douglass was a member of the Massachusetts State House of Representatives in 1899, 1900, 1906, and again in 1913.  Douglass was delegate to the Massachusetts constitutional convention in 1917 and 1918; author and playwright; delegate to the Democratic National Conventions in 1928 and 1932.  Douglass was elected as a Democrat to the Sixty-ninth and to the four succeeding Congresses (March 4, 1925 – January 3, 1935); chairman, House Committee on Education (Seventy-second and Seventy-third Congresses).  Douglass was an unsuccessful candidate for renomination in 1934.  Douglass resumed the practice of law; served as commissioner of penal institutions of Boston from 1935 until his death in West Roxbury, Massachusetts in 1939.

Douglass is buried in St. Joseph Cemetery. Survived by two sons; Paul Joseph Douglass [Manhasset,NY] and John Joseph Douglass [Newark, DE]

References
Notes

Bibliography

1873 births
1939 deaths
Boston College alumni
Georgetown University Law Center alumni
Democratic Party members of the Massachusetts House of Representatives
People from East Boston, Boston
Members of the 1917 Massachusetts Constitutional Convention
Democratic Party members of the United States House of Representatives from Massachusetts